Middletown is an unincorporated community in Marion Township, Allen County, in the U.S. state of Indiana.

Geography

References

Unincorporated communities in Allen County, Indiana
Unincorporated communities in Indiana
Fort Wayne, IN Metropolitan Statistical Area